Akarsu is a village in the Nusaybin District of Mardin Province in Turkey. The village is populated by Kurds of the Omerkan tribe and had a population of 1,755 in 2021.

History 
The village was formerly populated by Armenians.

References 

Villages in Nusaybin District
Kurdish settlements in Mardin Province